Art Rice-Jones  (December 12, 1912 - November 12, 1989) was a Canadian ice hockey goaltender who played for the 1935 World Champion Winnipeg Monarchs at Davos, Switzerland.

Awards and achievements
Turnbull Cup MJHL Championships (1931 & 1932)
Memorial Cup Championship (1931)
IIHF World Championship (1935)
"Honoured Member" of the Manitoba Hockey Hall of Fame

External links

Art Rice-Jones’s biography at Manitoba Hockey Hall of Fame

Canadian ice hockey goaltenders
Winnipeg Monarchs players
1989 deaths
1912 births
People from the County of Paintearth No. 18
Place of death missing